Airport (空港) is Joey Yung's second EP in 2010. The title track 空港 is the theme song for "Nokia Joey Yung Concert Number 6". The song is the EP's third single. Her first single "綠野仙蹤" is the commercial theme song for Broadway Electronics. The music video for the second single "破相" is the first ever 3D Music Video in Hong Kong.

Released versions
First edition
Released on 20 August 2010
Plus Bonus DVD
One2free Special Edition
Version distributed by One2free only.
With ticket of One2free Musicholic 容祖兒空港見面會.
Different cover.
Same content of the EP plus a card sleeve.
Second Edition
Released on 5 November 2010
Different cover
Different package
More content in bonus DVD

Track listing

Personnel

Joey Yung albums
2010 EPs